Utah State Route 63 (SR-63) is a state highway in the U.S. state of Utah.

Route description

Starting from the northern edge of Bryce Canyon National Park, the route runs northward, passing a view area, and exiting Dixie National Forest within the first mile. It continues north until its terminus at the intersection with SR-12 less than two miles later.

History

Previous designation
This route number was originally in use from 19311971 as a route from Salina to Scipio. The route number was withdrawn when this route was transferred to SR-26, and subsequently designated as part of US-50.

Current designation

Utah State Route 12 originally had a short spur serving Bryce Canyon. This spur was split off into a distinct highway, SR-63, in 1975.

Major intersections

References

 063
063